Wasaga Beach (or simply Wasaga) is a town in Simcoe County, Ontario, Canada. Situated along the longest freshwater beach in the world, it is a popular summer tourist destination. To the west, Collingwood and The Blue Mountains also attract visitors much of the year. The town is situated along a very long sandy beach on Nottawasaga Bay in Georgian Bay and the winding Nottawasaga River. The beaches are part of the Wasaga Beach Provincial Park; the park area totals 168 hectares (415 acres). Wasaga Beach has a year-round population of 24,862 as of 2021, but during the summer months the population increases with many seasonal residents.

The economy has struggled for some years, particularly since a major fire in late November 2007 destroyed many of the stores. It depends on tourists in an area where the primary shopping season is three to four months per year. In March 2017, the town passed its Downtown Development Master Plan, a 20-year strategy for significant redevelopment of the tourist area and adding a downtown to the business area. The goal is to improve tourism, diversify the economy, and get beyond its "party town" image.

History

 
Wasaga Beach and the surrounding area was inhabited by the Huron-Wendat Nation for centuries before they were conquered and driven from their ancestral lands in 1649 by the Iroquois Haudenosaunee (Known as the Five Nation Iroquois Confederacy). The word Nottawasaga is of Algonquin origin. Nottawa means "Iroquois" and saga means "mouth of the river"; the word "Nottawasaga" was used by Algonquin scouts as a warning if they saw Iroquois raiding parties approaching their villages.

In 1812 the United States declared war on Great Britain and invaded Upper Canada on several occasions. Wasaga Beach became a strategic location at the mouth of the Nottawasaga River leading to Fort Willow and the Nine Mile Portage which was part of the supply line for British forces in the War of 1812 to Fort Michilimackinac and points to the north and west. The Royal Navy schooner HMS Nancy was scuttled in the Nottawasaga River to prevent the Americans from capturing her and her stores.

Lumbering was the main industry for the remainder of the 19th century.  Logs were floated downriver and into the bay, gathered at ports to feed local saw mills.

Because Wasaga Beach had sandy soil unsuitable for cultivation, it did not attract early European settlement. In the 1820s the first sign of settlement in the area began as John Goessman surveyed Flos Township. In 1826, land was being sold for four shillings an acre. Though unsuitable for farming, the Wasaga Beach area had an abundance of trees. In the late 1830s and throughout the rest of the century, the logging industry was key to the economy and integral to development of the area. The first permanent settler was John Van Vlack, who arrived in 1869 and founded a settlement on the south side of the Nottawasaga River near its mouth and named it after himself. In 1872, a wooden bridge, the Vanvlack Bridge, was constructed east of the present Main Street bridge to provide access to the beach, then used mainly as a road. The name Wasaga Beach was first used in the area in the late 19th Century.

During the 1900s, families began to discover the beauty of the area. The beach gradually became a place for family picnics and holidays during the summer months, and the first cottages were built. In 1909, a new steel bridge was constructed to replace the Vanvlack Bridge. Wasaga Beach had its beginning as a major resort area when the first beachfront hotel, The Capstan Inn, was opened in 1915 by entrepreneur John McLean in what would later develop into the present Beach One area. In 1918, he opened the Dardanella Dance Hall, and over the next several decades more hotels, venues, and amusements would open. During the 1940s, servicemen stationed at Base Borden, a nearby military base, visited Wasaga Beach's amusement park, and they made Wasaga Beach known across the country. After the war, Wasaga Beach continued to be a popular place for cottages and day trips.

Wasaga Beach entered history's headlines in 1934. It was the site of departure for the first overseas flight from mainland Canada across the Atlantic to England. A plane named the Trail of the Caribou used Wasaga Beach's long, flat, sandy beach as a take-off strip.

The town was originally referred to as "the northern border of Flos Sunnidale and Nottawasaga Townships".  The first municipal reference occurred with a designation of a Local Improvement District in 1947. In 1949, Wasaga Beach was classified as a police village in the Township of Sunnidale, and was incorporated as a village in 1951.

In 1959, the beach was designated as a "Crown beach", which was the precursor to the establishment of Wasaga Beach Provincial Park. The province began expropriating beachfront properties to create a continuous belt of parkland along the full length of the beach, save for keeping the main beach area for commercial uses. This proved controversial; so the province scaled down plans and settled for separated parks, which are today's Beach Areas 2-6. Driving and parking along the beach was previously permitted and popular, but in 1973 the province took cars off the beach.

Wasaga Beach was incorporated as a town on January 1, 1974, and its boundaries were expanded. The permanent population stood at 4,034, a dramatic increase from 1965, when 500 people were residents. Today, the town has 24,862 full-time residents and 16,000 seasonal and part-time residents.

Wasaga Beach fire
On November 30, 2007, a major fire destroyed 90 per cent of the buildings along the street mall in the Beach One area. About 17 seasonal businesses were said to have been affected, including bikini shops, ice cream parlours, a restaurant, a motel, and an arcade. Nearly 100 firefighters from surrounding areas battled the blaze for hours. The Toronto Star later reported that "Twenty-one businesses in eight buildings overlooking Georgian Bay were destroyed, causing an estimated $5 million in damages."

Controversy also arose over whether or not the fire was deliberately set in order to allow unobstructed progression with the planned development or whether it was simply an accident. Two young men (one from Barrie and the other from Springwater) were charged with arson. There was no indication that the fire was deliberately set to remove the old buildings in advance of planned development.

The Town of Wasaga Beach worked out a plan to help the remaining businesses open for the season but plans for hotels, a theme park and a monorail were cancelled and never revived.

Local government 
The town's council includes a mayor, deputy mayor, and five councilors that are elected at-large. The members of council elected as of the 2022 municipal election are:

Mayor: Brian Smith

Deputy Mayor: Tanya Snell

Councillors:

 Joe Belanger
 Sasha-Rose Dileo
 Faye Ego
 Ellen Timms 
 Richard White

Economic challenges 

Despite the major fire, the beach and the remaining businesses reopened the following summer. Although the destroyed buildings had been considered dated, they were missed by residents and visitors. In 2008, an entertainment dome was built, intended as a temporary structure until development started. It lasted until February 2011 when the exterior cover was destroyed during a storm; repairs were not done and the dome never reopened. The structure was removed in May 2012.

The long-term plans after the fire, by Armand and Dov Levy's Blue Beach Avenue corporation, included a rebuild of the area in a modern style with shopping, an indoor/outdoor theme park, two major hotels and monorail service. The proposed development came to an abrupt end when Blue Beach Avenue declared bankruptcy in 2010. "The past couple of years haven't been kind to the tourist industry ... So I gather there were some major cash shortfalls that put them in this situation," the town's mayor said at that time.
Armand Levy was subsequently charged with fraud in 2012 after an investigation of misappropriation of the insurance money paid out after the 2007 fire but was ultimately acquitted.

Reduced tourism, partly because of the loss of many retail buildings, has continued to be a problem in the area. The majority of sales take place during the tourist season, which is typically not much longer than three months per year. (The most recent stats indicate a decline in tourism "of roughly 100,000 a year between 2002 and 2012".)

To step up development, in 2015 the town spent $13.5 million to purchase seven properties, including eight buildings and 28 rental units, along Beach Area One, becoming a landlord to some businesses, including three bars. The town acquired any existing leases from tenants and succeeded in leasing most of the empty space to commercial enterprises by July 2016. A few of the tenants subsequently enquired about the possibility of breaking their leases because they were struggling financially. The town council agreed to a one-time opportunity for businesses to break their leases without a penalty; requests to do so had to be submitted no later than September 23, 2016.

The beach is owned and operated by Ontario Parks as the Wasaga Beach Provincial Park, and it is the area's primary attraction. Of the six main beach areas, Beach areas One and Two and the adjacent private/public lands have historically functioned as the main destination for tourism activity. Due to the economic climate, losses due to fires, and recent failed private redevelopment plans, Beach areas One and Two have been in steady decline.

This area is so important to the town that it undertook an in-depth community visioning exercise, called Opportunity Wasaga, to develop a long-term vision for the future of the public and private lands in this area.

There has been a great deal of controversy (among the public and council members) about the previous strategies used by the Town of Wasaga Beach, including the 2015 purchase of the seven properties for $13.8 million, using borrowed money. "That's no small sum for the town of 18,000 that will collect $20.3 million in property taxes this year and spend $48 million in operating and capital costs," according to a report by the Toronto Star.

New development plans 

An entirely new Downtown Development Master Plan was released by town council in late January 2017, with an estimate for capital investment of $625 million and a 20 plus year time frame for completion. The first phase (five to 10 years) will cost about $200 million for two development areas, one on the beach and one on the main land.

In July 2018, under the council led by then-mayor Brian Smith, council agreed to enter into a Letter of Intent with FRAM Building Group for the development of town-owned land in the downtown and at the beachfront.

In December 2018, under a new council, with Nina Bifolchi as mayor, council decided to undertake a review of the development of town-owned lands in the downtown and at the beachfront.

The council agreed to let the Letter of Intent the town had with FRAM Building Group Ltd. lapse at the end of December 2018 as a first step in the review process. The Downtown Master Plan, however, remains in place.

In March 2019, FRAM advised the town it is not interested in being a part of future development of the beachfront. The town is now looking for developers interested in developing town-owned land at the beachfront.

In September 2021, the Wasaga Beach Ratepayers Association opposed the scope of what they perceived to be excessively high densities in the development plans, and the association's president was accused by the Town of spreading false information and exaggerating said densities, as well as claiming residents were being shut out of Town Hall. This led to residents protesting in late October.

Casino
 The Wasaga Playtime Casino is located on Mosley Street just east of Highway 26, and opened on November 23, 2022. The casino was first proposed in March 2018 by the Ontario Lottery and Gaming Corporation who selected Gateway Casinos to operate a casino in the South Georgian Bay area, and Wasaga Beach was selected as the location in October of that year.

Wasaga Beach Provincial Park

Beach Areas 1–6 can be accessed off Mosley Street in Wasaga. Allenwood and New Wasaga Beaches are north of the Nottawasaga River and are accessed via River Road East.

The park is available for day use only. The park is a habitat for birds, primarily for shorebirds including the endangered piping plover. In winter, they are used for cross-country skiing and snowshoeing. The visitor centre provides access to the Nancy Island Historic Site with a theatre, a museum and a lighthouse.

Geography

Over two million people visit Wasaga Beach every summer, attracted by the town's freshwater beach (stretching ), swim in shallow (warm), clean water and enjoy the panoramic views of the Niagara Escarpment across the bay. There are many recreational trails that are used for hiking, cycling, cross-country skiing and snowmobiling. The Nottawasaga River offers game fishing and canoe routes.

The beach is divided into sections, with the beaches numbered 1 to 6 from east to west, with off-beach public park areas, mostly with parking and all with toilet facilities. A published summary indicates that Beaches 2–4 benefit from shade trees, a bike trail and a playground. Beach 1 is the most touristy, with bars, beach-themed shops and fast food restaurants, attracting primarily young adults. Beach areas 3 to 6 have many seasonal waterfront cottages between the park areas; Shore Lane is used for jogging, biking and roller blading. There are two additional beaches nearby, New Wasaga Beach and Allenwood Beach that are cut off from the 1–6 beach areas by the river; these also have seasonal residents. The town publishes a map of all of these areas.

In the summer months it is a popular place for beach volleyball and sunbathing. A boardwalk runs most of the way along Beach 1 and 2. Beach 1 draws the largest crowds, with the popularity of the beaches decreasing further west. East of the town limits, the sandy beach continues east and north into Tiny Beaches, nearly as far as the tip of the Penetang Peninsula. The beach in these areas is also fronted by many cottages and homes, but unlike in Wasaga Beach, the beaches are mostly private property.

The beach's position on the waters of Nottawasaga Bay means that summer temperatures are moderated somewhat by the water, so summer days can be quite comfortable especially when there is a breeze off the bay. In winter, however, winds off the bay trigger very heavy and intense snow squalls. Due to these heavy snowfalls, activities include snowmobiling, cross-country skiing and other winter sports. Downhill skiing is available at nearby Blue Mountain. There are many miles of fresh groomed trails for snowmobiling thanks to the Ontario Federation of Snowmobile Clubs and in part to the purchasers of the trail passes.

An unusual aspect of the town compared to other Ontario Cottage country communities, is that most of the cottages are non-waterfront and are closely spaced on a network of side streets within the town itself (mostly between Mosley Street and the bay), rather than being located on larger lots in more rustic settings often well outside the said towns as is the typical case elsewhere. Older residential areas have a semi-rural, hamlet-type character, although more recent (post-1990) developments are suburban in nature.

The town has a large community centre; the RecPlex, which has an auditorium, an amphitheatre and a YMCA. There is also the Wasaga Stars Arena, which is being replaced by a larger facility, which is expected to be completed by the summer of 2023.

Land area, geology and topography

The Town of Wasaga Beach covers an area of  comprised predominantly of sand and loamy sand that exhibit excessive to good drainage and irregular to moderately sloping topography. The poor soil quality makes it difficult to sustain lush lawns in the town. The Canada Land Inventory for Agriculture rates the lands as predominately Class Six and Seven with primary restrictions of adverse topography, erosion damage and low natural fertility.

Demographics

The 2006 Canadian census indicated a population of 15,029 residents. When compared to its 2001 population of 12,419, Wasaga Beach was one of the fastest-growing communities in Canada, based on population growth percentage (21.0% over 5 years).

Education

Buses transport over 760 students to high schools located outside the town, in Stayner, Elmvale, and Collingwood. Schools in Wasaga Beach include: Birchview Dunes Elementary School, Worsley Elementary School and St Noel Chabanal Catholic Elementary School.

Wasaga Beach Transit

Transit service in Wasaga Beach is operated by Georgian Coach Lines, using town-owned buses, under the name Wasaga Beach Transit. The service was started with one route in July 2008, and quickly expanded to two routes in the summer of 2009.  Services for Wasaga Beach Transit occur in a loop from the Wasaga Stars Arena in the east to the Real Canadian Superstore in the west every hour from 7 am to 7 pm. There is a transit link between Wasaga Beach and Collingwood that operates on a continuous loop.

Transit service in Wasaga Beach is no longer operated by Georgian Coach Lines. The contract was changed in the summer of 2014 to Sinton-Landmark Bus Lines.

Notable residents
 Jason Arnott – NHL hockey player; born in Collingwood and raised in Wasaga Beach; in the summer of 2000, Jason Arnott Day was declared in Wasaga Beach to celebrate his Stanley-Cup-winning goal scored in double overtime
 Adam Copeland and Jason Reso – WWE stars better known as Edge and Christian; lived together in Wasaga Beach throughout their time in college and early training

See also

 List of communities in Ontario

References

External links

Populated places on Lake Huron in Canada
Lower-tier municipalities in Ontario
Municipalities in Simcoe County
Towns in Ontario
Beaches of Ontario